Rebecques is a former commune in the Pas-de-Calais department in northern France. On 1 January 2016, it was merged into the new commune Saint-Augustin.

Geography
Rebecques lies about 7 miles (12 km) south of Saint-Omer, on the D192 road, in the valley of the River Lys.

Population

Places of interest
 The church of Saint Maclou, dating from the sixteenth century.

See also
Communes of the Pas-de-Calais department

References

Former communes of Pas-de-Calais